John Bowers  (born 2 January 1956) is a British barrister and part-time judge who has been Principal of Brasenose College, Oxford since 1 October 2015.

Born in Grimsby, the son of Alfred Bowers and Irene, he was educated at Clee Grammar School in Cleethorpes, and then studied law at Lincoln College, Oxford.  He was called to the Bar in 1979, took silk (became a Queen's Counsel) in 1998, became a recorder in 2003, and has been a deputy High Court Judge since 2010. He is an honorary professor at the University of Hull.

Bowers is a supporter of Grimsby Town F.C.  He is married to Suzanne Franks and has three children.

Publications 
Bowers has written, alone or with others, 14 books on law including
 
 
 
 

Writing in The Law Society Gazette Graham Clayton described The Law of Industrial Action and Trade Union Recognition as "a work of authority and clarity". Writing in the Industrial Law Journal David Lewis described the first edition of Whistleblowing as "a comprehensive and insightful analysis".

References

External links 
 Littleton Chambers homepage
 Interview with John Bowers in Times Higher Education

 

Living people
Alumni of Lincoln College, Oxford
Principals of Brasenose College, Oxford
1956 births
21st-century King's Counsel
British legal scholars